Luciana, released in 1994, is the second album by Juno Reactor. It contains only one track, titled "Lu.ci-ana", which runs for 61 minutes and 20 seconds. It differs from Juno Reactor's other releases in that it is a more experimental and dark ambient-focused album, compared to their other psytrance works.

References

External links
 JunoReactor.com profile of Luciana

1994 albums
Juno Reactor albums
Ambient albums by English artists